Lloyd family may refer to:

 Lloyd family (Dolobran), of Dolobran, Montgomeryshire
 Lloyd family (Birmingham), from Birmingham, England, branch of above
 Lloyd family (Maryland), from Talbot County, Maryland